The House of Paluni was a dynastic house in Greater Armenia from the fourth to the sixth century AD.

The princes of Paluni occupied a remnant of the territorial dominion of the people of Lope or Puli, found in the Hittite annals, situated between Astyan and Taron, a domain that became named for them (the Balabitene occupied another remnant of that territory). The Paluni seem to have become part of the Mamikonian-ruled Taron, and then emigrated to Vaspurakan, which it named for itself. It disappeared soon after the start of the sixth century.

See also
List of regions of old Armenia

Bibliography

René Grousset, Histoire de l'Arménie des origines à 1071, Paris, Payot, 1947 (reimpr. 1973, 1984, 1995, 2008), 644 pages

Early medieval Armenian regions